Unrepentant is a studio album by American guitarist Greg Koch. Released April 24, 2017 just prior to the formation of his new band Koch Marshall Trio.

Background

Koch released Unrepentant as a solo artist. He formed the Koch Marshall Trio and subsequently released the album Toby Arrives just months after the release of Unrepentant.

Release and reception
Greg Koch assembled musicians from his previous bands to record this album: including Gary Keohler and Kevin Mushel. The award winning band: two former members of "Greg Koch and the Tone controls" a band which previously won five Wisconsin Area Music Awards for Blues Artist of the Year (1993, 1995, 1996, 1997 and 1998).

The Unrepentant album was released April 24, 2017.

The Koch Marshall Trio often plays the title track Unrepentant in their live performance.

Track listing

Personnel

Greg Koch
 Greg Koch – Lead guitar, Rhythm guitar
 Dylan Koch, Del Bennett, Andrew E, Gary Keohler – Drums
 Eric Hervey, Kevin Mushel, Gerrett Sayers - bass
 Theo Merriweather - Keyboards
 Darren Kramer - Trombones and arrangement

References

2017 albums
Bear Family Records albums